Haara Dil  is a 2018 Pakistani television series directed by Furqan Adam and written by Rabia Razzaq. The show stars Danish Taimoor and Hiba Bukhari as leads. It premiered on 12 April 2018 on A-Plus TV and aired every Thursday. It tells the story of a middle-aged couple who gets pregnant, much to the disappointment of their adult daughter Momina, and the social pressure the family faces.

Plot
Momina lives with her parents, Abraar and Shagufta, and her younger sister Abeer. Momina is in a relationship with Arham, a wealthy young man. Arham is the son of her father's best friend, Afaan. Arham's mother, Amtul, and sister, Areej, dislike Momina as she belongs to a middle-class family,

Momina and Abeer get shocked when their mother informs them about her pregnancy. Arham is also shocked by the news but chooses to support Momina. Abraar finds out that Shagufta is expecting a baby boy and refuses to terminate Shagufta's pregnancy. Amtul humiliates Shagufta. Unable to bear the humiliation, Shagufta has a premature delivery and dies during childbirth. Momina and Abeer blame Arham and Amtul for Shagufta's death. 

Momina starts avoiding Arham. She spends her day caring for her little brother, Sami. Meanwhile, Abraar gets married to Fehmi. Amtul decides to get Arham engaged with Fiza, Areej's sister-in-law. Momina and Arham's relationship faces many trials and tribulations but eventually emerges victorious.

Cast 
Danish Taimoor as Arham
Hiba Bukhari as Momina
Rabya Kulsoom as Abeer
Yashma Gill as Fiza
Mehmood Aslam as Momina's father
Shaheen Khan as Momina's mother
Seemi Pasha as Arham's mother
Farah Nadir as Zeba
Shehryar Zaidi as Arham's father
Javeria Abbasi as Momina's step mother
Rameez Siddiqui as Faraz
Birjees Farooqui as Faraz's mother
Fahima Awan as Areej

References

External links
Official website 

2018 Pakistani television series debuts
Pakistani drama television series
Urdu-language television shows